Ars Longa Vita Brevis is the second album by the English progressive rock group the Nice.

Recording
Guitarist David O'List left the band during the recording of the album, leaving the remaining three members to complete it. After flirting briefly with replacement guitarists (including Steve Howe, later to join Yes), the Nice decided to carry on as a keyboard-led trio. The title is an aphorism attributed to Hippocrates usually rendered as "Art is long, life is short"; Keith Emerson's interpretation of this can be gauged from his sleevenote:Newton's first law of motion states a body will remain at rest or continue with uniform motion in a straight line unless acted on by a force. This time the force happened to come from a European source. Ours is an extension of the original Allegro from Brandenburg Concerto No. 3. Yesterday I met someone who changed my life, today we put down a sound that made our aim accurate. Tomorrow is yesterday's history and art will still be there, even if life terminates.
Structurally the album started where its predecessor left off – shortish songs and extended work-outs based on classical themes – but a step forward was taken with the addition of an orchestra and the extended length of Ars Longa Vita Brevis itself, foreshadowing the later Five Bridges Suite. Furthermore, this album contains some songs in which Keith Emerson sings lead vocals: he shares the singing with Lee Jackson in "Daddy, Where Did I Come From", sings all lead vocals on "Happy Freuds" and sings the bridge in "Little Arabella".

Guest guitarist Malcolm Langstaff died in 2007.

Reception

Allmusic's Bruce Eder described the album as "a genuinely groundbreaking effort".

Track listing 
All songs written by Keith Emerson and Lee Jackson, except where noted.

Side one 
 "Daddy, Where Did I Come From" – 3:44
 "Little Arabella" – 4:18
 "Happy Freuds" – 3:25
 "Intermezzo from the Karelia Suite" (Sibelius) – 8:57
 "Don Edito el Gruva" (Emerson, Jackson, Brian Davison) – 0:13

Side two 
 "Ars Longa Vita Brevis" – 19:20
 "Prelude" (Emerson) – 1:49
 "1st Movement – Awakening" (Davison) – 4:01
 "2nd Movement – Realisation" (Jackson, David O'List, Emerson) – 4:54
 "3rd Movement – Acceptance "Brandenburger"" (J.S.Bach, Davison, Emerson, Jackson) – 4:23
 "4th Movement – Denial" (Davison, Emerson, Jackson) – 3:23
 "Coda – Extension to the Big Note" (Emerson) – 0:46

Bonus tracks on the 1973 Columbia release
 "America" (Stephen Sondheim and Leonard Bernstein)
 "2nd Amendment" (Davison, Jackson)

Added to side one (tracks 1 and 2) on the Columbia Records release via their Columbia Special Products subsidiary.

Bonus tracks on the 1998 rerelease
 "Brandenburger" (Mono single mix)
 "Happy Freuds" (Mono single mix)

Bonus track on the 2005 rerelease
 "Happy Freuds" – 3:27

Personnel 
The Nice
 Keith Emerson – keyboards, backing and lead (1, 2, 3) vocals
 Lee Jackson – bass guitar, lead vocals (all but 4)
 Brian Davison – drums
 David O'List – Guitar on 1973 Columbia bonus tracks "America" and "Second Amendment" 
with:
 Malcolm Langstaff – guitar (6b)
 Robert Stewart – orchestral arranger, conductor
Technical
 Don Brewer – engineer/consultant
 Gered Mankowitz – cover photograph and X-rays of The Nice

References 

1968 albums
The Nice albums
Immediate Records albums
Castle Communications albums
Repertoire Records albums
Albums produced by Keith Emerson
Albums produced by Brian Davison (drummer)
Albums produced by Lee Jackson (bassist)